Chris Tang Ping-keung  (born 4 July 1965) is a Hong Kong law enforcement administrator, currently serving the Secretary for Security of Hong Kong since 25 June 2021. He previously served as the Commissioner of the Hong Kong Police Force from November 2019 to June 2021.

Early life and education
Tang was born on 4 July 1965 in Hong Kong to a family with roots in Dongguan, Guangdong. He lived in Hong Kong's then the Western District since he was a child, and moved out when he got married. 

He received a bachelor of social science with a major in social work from the Chinese University of Hong Kong in 1987. Tang also holds a master of business administration and a master's degree in international security and strategy.

Career
He joined the Royal Hong Kong Police Force in the 1987 as an inspector. He spent many years working in the criminal investigation, international liaison and operational command. He was seconded to Interpol General Secretariat a specialised officer from 2006 to 2008, before he was promoted in the organisation as the head of Criminal Organisation and Violent Unit.

In 2015, Tang was appointed Assistant Commissioner of Police and discharged duties as regional commander of Hong Kong Island and Assistant Commissioner, Personnel. He was promoted to the rank of Senior Assistant Commissioner and appointed as Director of Operations before he became Deputy Commissioner of Police (Operations). He was awarded the Police Distinguished Service Medal (PDSM) in 2018.

Tang was appointed the Commissioner of Police by the State Council of China in November 2019, succeeding Stephen Lo amid the widespread 2019–20 Hong Kong protests, at a time when police were under unrelenting criticism for excessive use of force. He was in charge of the police operation code-named Tiderider in response to street protests triggered by the extradition bill since June 2019. He has stated that the police are against having an independent inquiry into allegations of police brutality, which is a key demand from the protesters, and claimed "fake news" was undermining the reputation of his police force. Following Tang's appointment as the Commissioner of Police in November 2019, the police changed its motto from "We serve with pride and care" which had been used for more than 20 years, to "Serving Hong Kong with Honour, Duty and Loyalty." According to the Taiwan News, he "is known as a hardliner in the conflict with the pro-democracy protesters." He has said the violence perpetrated by activists is "very close to terrorism."

On 3 July 2020, Xinhua, a China's national news agency, stated that the Committee for Safeguarding National Security of the Hong Kong Special Administrative Region was formally established with 10 members. As the Commissioner of Hong Kong Police Force, Tang was an ex officio member of the committee.

On 10 February 2021, Carrie Lam awarded Tang the Chief Executive's Commendation for Government/Public Service for his "significant contribution to safeguarding national security and the implementation of the Hong Kong National Security Law." In February 2021, Tang said that he was considering legislation to ban insults to both police officers and public officials.

In April 2021, Tang claimed that the United States had used its agents in Hong Kong to stir anti-governmental protests in 2019, and claimed that the protests were not caused by the now-withdrawn extradition bill. Also in April 2021, Tang criticized Apple Daily, stating that the pro-democracy newspaper was spreading fake news and inciting hatred in the city.

In January 2022, Tang claimed that foreign spies were in Hong Kong since 2019 "to foment a 'colour revolution' in Hong Kong" and that new security legislation was needed to "handle espionage acts and offences in a targeted manner to prevent incidents endangering national security".

In March 2022, Tang threatened those who were asked by government officers to isolate at COVID-19 community isolation facilities that "If they refuse to go, they can be fined HK$5,000 or given up to two months in jail. If they leave the facilities during isolation, they can be fined HK$5,000 as well, or face up to six months behind bars".

In April 2022, Chinese style goose stepping was announced to be implemented across the entire force, a year after Tang claimed that the force had "no plans" to change to it.

In August 2022, Tang said that the government will increase the propaganda for national security education.

In September 2022, Tang said that external forces were still present and actively trying to undermine the government.

In November 2022, at the Hong Kong Sevens, Tang was booed and told to "wear a mask" by the crowd.

In November 2022, Tang said that members of lion dance performances should be examined for criminal behavior.

In January 2023, Tang said that no protests had been approved in 3 years due to "health" concerns.

In February 2023, Tang said that some visitors to prisons used their visits to "corrupt" youth and instill hated of the Hong Kong government into them.

U.S. sanctions
In August 2020, Tang and ten other Hong Kong officials were sanctioned by the United States Department of the Treasury under an Executive Order 13936 by President Trump for acts undermining Hong Kong's autonomy. Chris Tang reportedly transferred his mortgage of property in Southern District from HSBC to Bank of China (Hong Kong) three days before sanctions took effect.

Tang was on a list issued by the US State Department on 14 October 2020, of ten individuals who materially contributed to the failure of the China to meet its obligations under the Sino–British Joint Declaration and Hong Kong's Basic Law.

Controversies and views

Alleged infringement of academic autonomy 
According to Stand News, Tang sent a letter to Stephen Cheung, the president of the Education University of Hong Kong (EduHK), on 27 April 2020 requesting a follow up to the speech of Choi Chun-wai (蔡俊威) on RTHK television programme Pentaprism II (左右紅藍綠). The speech of Choi mentioned the Siege of the Hong Kong Polytechnic University and criticized the actions of Hong Kong Police, while Tang accused Choi for inciting hatred towards the Hong Kong Police.  Democratic Party Legislative Council member Ted Hui expressed concern and stated that he would send a letter to Civil Service Bureau to follow up on Tang's actions. In support of Choi, Pro-democracy group Progressive Scholars Group accused Tang of infringing on academic freedom and autonomy. Choi was also supported by the student unions of 9 universities in Hong Kong, including that of  Education University of Hong Kong. On the other hand, the episode received complaints from a total of 347 members of the public.   The independent regulatory agency of the Broadcasting Services, Communications Authority (CA), initiated an investigation and commented that "CHOI’s remarks had apparently been distorted, inaccurate information or personal opinions on the Internet without making clear the sources of information… The CA took the view that the host’s remarks made in the programme was irresponsible, and could be regarded as a hate speech with the effect of inciting hatred against the Police, unfair to and were capable of adversely affecting the reputation of the Police." RTHK was subsequently issued a "Serious Warning" by the authority.

Hong Kong Journalists Association 
In September 2021, Tang claimed that the Hong Kong Journalists Association had infiltrated schools to spread anti-governmental political ideas. Afterwards, Tang claimed that he was expressing public opinion, stating "I think I am not making any allegations. I just cast doubt, which is not just from me. I think it's from a large number (of people) of the community. They have the same doubt about the association."

Fake news 
In December 2021, Tang claimed that police officers had never entered school premises during the Siege of the Chinese University of Hong Kong, and that a report was "fake news" for saying that police officers had entered the premises. Photos later showed that police did in fact enter the premises.

In August 2022, Tang said some young people had been "poisoned by fake news" and became anti-government, and suggested increasing publicity and national education to make people proud to be Chinese.

In September 2022, Tang reiterated his desire for an anti-fake news law, saying that some fake news has incited anti-government hatred. He also said that identities of some reporters were vague and there should be a way to distinguish professional reporters.

Democracy 
In January 2022, Tang claimed that "The cessation of Apple Daily impressed me the most. This newspaper was poisoning Hongkongers, especially giving the young people a wrong idea about China", and also said that "Since the newspaper has been shut down now, the society will be better and more democratic". Finally, Tang said that "The national security law and the 'patriots administering Hong Kong' principle in the new Legislative Council term marked a new milestone in Hong Kong's democracy."

Protest inmates 
In September 2022, Tang said that inmates who were arrested during the 2019-2020 Hong Kong protests and later convicted were being taught to understand China's history while in prison.

2022 COVID-19 protests in China 
In November 2022, Tang said that 2022 COVID-19 protests in China that take place in Hong Kong were a "a colour revolution" using "anti-China" social media, and may violate the national security law. Tang said that using words such as "dictatorship" could be seen as endangering national security and violating the law.

Hong Kong Alliance in Support of Patriotic Democratic Movements of China 
In September 2021, Tang said that the Hong Kong Alliance in Support of Patriotic Democratic Movements of China was a foreign agent, but did not provide any evidence or proof. The Alliance said that Tang's "irresponsible accusations" led to the eventual arrest and closure of the Alliance.

Glory to Hong Kong 
In December 2022, Tang appealed to Google to "correct" the search results to list March of the Volunteers instead of Glory to Hong Kong when searching for the national anthem of Hong Kong, and said that the song being the top result hurt the feelings of Hong Kong people. Google refused the request from Tang. After Google explained that search results were based on algorithms, Tang said the explanation was "evasive" and "inconceivable."

Republic of China / Taiwan 
In September 2021, Tang claimed that celebrations for the Republic of China's Double Ten day could risk breaching the national security law. Tang also claimed that Taiwan is a part of China, and anybody attempting to alter that view would risk being arrested. Many precursors to the Republic of China were based in Hong Kong, including places along the Dr Sun Yat-sen Historical Trail.

Tony Chan Tong-ka 
In October 2021, when the mother of Amber Poon Hiu-wing invited Tang to meet with her, Tang did not show up. Tang blamed Taiwan and said that "Taiwan is part of China. No matter how much Taiwan would like to manipulate politics, they can never change the fact that Taiwan is part of China. I hope Taiwan would stop political manipulation, bring justice to light and allow Chan Tong-kai to go to Taiwan." Poon's mother criticized Tang and said "Their salaries are paid by Hong Kong people, they should fulfil their responsibility, either put Chan Tong-kai on trial in Hong Kong, or put him on a plane for him to surrender in Taiwan."

In September 2022, Tang again blamed "political reasons" for Chan not being able to be sent to Taiwan.

Filmography
In an interview with Clifton Ko, a Hong Kong director, Tang revealed that he, following his schoolmates during university time, worked as a bit part in two of Ko's films to make some money, with a daily salary of HKD700 in 1984.

Happy Ghost (1984)
Merry Christmas (1984)
Special Female Force (2016)
Guarding Our City (2021)

Personal life 
Tang is a voting member of the Hong Kong Jockey Club.

References 

 

 
 

Hong Kong Police commissioners
Living people
1965 births
Hong Kong civil servants
Government officials of Hong Kong
Alumni of the Chinese University of Hong Kong
Individuals sanctioned by the United States under the Hong Kong Autonomy Act
Specially Designated Nationals and Blocked Persons List